Francisco Rico Manrique (born 28 April 1942, Barcelona) is a Spanish philologist.

He was a student of José Manuel Blecua and Martín de Riquer. He is a professor of Medieval Spanish Literature at the Autonomous University of Barcelona and, since 1987, a member of the Royal Spanish Academy as well as the Académia das Ciéncias de Lisboa, the Accademia Nazionale dei Lincei and the British Academy.

Rico was elected to Seat p of the Real Academia Española on 13 March 1986, he took up his seat on 4 June 1987.

He has edited many classics from the medieval period and the "Siglo de Oro", and has written numerous studies on medieval and renaissance literature. He has also edited the Historia y Crítica de la Literatura Española (Nine volumes, with supplements).

He currently oversees the Classical Library series (started by Editorial Crítica and now a part of "Reader's Circle", a division of Bertelsmann) following guidelines from the Centro para la Edición de los Clásicos Españoles, which Rico began and helped to develop.

In 1998, he was awarded the twelfth Menéndez Pelayo International Prize and, in 2004, the Ramón Menéndez Pidal National Research Prize.

Selected works
 La novela picaresca y el punto de vista, Seix Barral (1970). English translation, The Picaresque Novel and the Point of View, Cambridge Univ. press, 1984.
 Alfonso el Sabio y la "General Estoria", Ariel (1972)
 Primera cuarentena y Tratado general de literatura, El Festín de Esopo (1982)  
 Texto y contextos: Estudios sobre la poesía española del siglo XV, Grijalba Mondadori (1991)  
 El sueño del humanismo Alianza (1993)  
 Figuras con paisaje, Destino (1994)  
 Los discursos del gusto, Destino (2003)  
 Tiempos del "Quijote", Acantilado (2012)

About Rico

References

External links
 Centro para la Edición de los Clásicos Españoles.

Spanish literary critics
Spanish philologists
Members of the Royal Spanish Academy
1942 births
Living people
Academic staff of the Autonomous University of Barcelona
Cervantists